Philip H. Morgan (November 9, 1825 – August 12, 1900) was an attorney, jurist, and diplomat from Louisiana who remained loyal to the Union during the American Civil War. A Republican, among the offices in which he served were Associate Justice of the Louisiana Supreme Court (1873-1877), Judge of the International Tribunal in Alexandria, Egypt (1878-1880), and Minister to Mexico (1880-1885).

Biography
Philip Hicky Morgan (sometimes spelled "Hickey" was born in Baton Rouge on August 9, 1825, a son of Thomas Gibbes (sometimes spelled "Gibbs") Morgan and the former Eliza Ann McKennan. He was named for Colonel Philip Hicky, a Louisiana plantation owner and friend of his father. He was educated locally and then attended the University of Paris in France from 1841 to 1846. He was fluent in several languages, including French and Spanish, and translated Louisiana's civil code into both languages.

Morgan joined the military for the Mexican–American War and attained the rank of first lieutenant as a member of Company K, 1st Louisiana Volunteer Militia Regiment. After attaining admission to the bar, he joined his father's law practice in Baton Rouge in 1848. In 1853, he relocated his practice to New Orleans and continued there until the 1870s.

Morgan was a judge of the 2nd District Court of Louisiana from 1853 to 1857. During the American Civil War, Morgan remained loyal to the Union. After the war, President Andrew Johnson nominated him as the U.S. attorney in New Orleans. He served from 1866 to 1867, but left office after the United States Senate did not approve the nomination. The appointment was made again by Johnson's successor, Ulysses S. Grant. The Senate approved, and Morgan served from 1869 to 1870.

From 1873 to 1876, Morgan was an associate justice of the Louisiana Supreme Court. In 1876, he became judge of the International Tribunal in Alexandria, Egypt, an appointment that bridged the Grant and Rutherford B. Hayes administrations. President Hayes named him Minister to Mexico, a position that he held from January 26, 1880 to June 6, 1885.

After the assignment to Mexico, Morgan practiced law in New York City from 1885 to 1900. He died in New York City and was interred at Allegheny Cemetery in Pittsburgh, Pennsylvania.

Family
In 1852, Morgan married Beatrice Ford (1826-1905), a native of Baton Rouge. They were the parents of nine children, five of whom survived to adulthood.

Morgan was the grandfather of Harry Hays Morgan Jr., great-grandfather of Gloria Vanderbilt and great-great-grandfather of Anderson Cooper. In addition, he was the grand-uncle of Cecil Morgan.

References

External links

Additional reading
 "Philip Hickey Morgan" (middle name misspelled), A Dictionary of Louisiana Biography, Vol. 1 (1988), p. 582
 "Philip Morgan," Dictionary of American Biography, XIII
 J.M. Callahan, American Foreign Policy in Mexican Relations (1932)

1825 births
1900 deaths
Politicians from New Orleans
Politicians from Baton Rouge, Louisiana
Lawyers from New York City
19th-century American diplomats
University of Paris alumni
United States Army officers
United States Attorneys for the District of Louisiana
American military personnel of the Mexican–American War
Louisiana Republicans
Justices of the Louisiana Supreme Court
Lawyers from New Orleans
Southern Unionists in the American Civil War
Burials at Allegheny Cemetery
People from Baton Rouge, Louisiana
19th-century American judges
19th-century American lawyers